Calothamnus microcarpus  is a plant in the myrtle family, Myrtaceae and is endemic to the south-west of Western Australia. It is an erect, either compact or spreading shrub with flat leaves and clusters of red flowers in spring. (In 2014 Craven, Edwards and Cowley proposed that the species be renamed Melaleuca microcarpa.)

Description
Its leaves are flat and have two grooves along both the upper and lower surfaces.

The flowers are bright red and arranged in small groups and the stamens are arranged in 4 claw-like bundles.

Taxonomy and naming
Calothamnus microcarpus was first formally described by Victorian Government Botanist Ferdinand von Mueller in 1862 in Volume 3, Part 21 of Fragmenta Phytographiae Australiae. The specific epithet microcarpus is derived from the ancient Greek words mikros (μικρός) meaning "small" and karpos (καρπός) meaning "fruit".

Distribution and habitat
Calothamnus microcarpus occurs in the Esperance Plains and Jarrah Forest biogeographic regions where it grows in clay and sandy soils.

Conservation
Calothamnus microcarpus is classified as "Priority Four" by the Western Australian government Department of Parks and Wildlife meaning that is rare or near threatened.

References

microcarpus
Myrtales of Australia
Plants described in 1862
Endemic flora of Western Australia
Taxa named by Ferdinand von Mueller